Warner Theater, also known as The High Street Theater, was a historic movie theater located in West Chester, Chester County, Pennsylvania. It was designed by the noted Chicago theater design firm of Rapp and Rapp and built by Warner Brothers.  It opened on November 14, 1930.  It is a composite of one-, two-, and three-story buildings in the Art Deco style.  It includes the theater, restaurant, and a series of seven small stores.  The theater has a two-story foyer with a three-story tower that formerly supported the marquee.  The auditorium measured 83 feet by 120 feet, and originally sat 1,650, 1,300 on the floor and 350 in the balcony.   The auditorium was demolished in  late 1986, and the remainder of the building has been renovated as the Hotel Warner. Hotel Warner today is a member of Historic Hotels of America, the official program of the National Trust for Historic Preservation.

It was listed on the National Register of Historic Places in 1979.  It is located in the West Chester Downtown Historic District.

See also
 List of Historic Hotels of America

References

External links

Hotel Warner website

West Chester, Pennsylvania
Theatres on the National Register of Historic Places in Pennsylvania
Art Deco architecture in Pennsylvania
Theatres completed in 1930
Buildings and structures in Chester County, Pennsylvania
National Register of Historic Places in Chester County, Pennsylvania
Individually listed contributing properties to historic districts on the National Register in Pennsylvania
Historic Hotels of America